John Blair Hurlburt (July 23, 1898 – March 3, 1968) was an American football halfback who played two seasons with the Chicago Cardinals of the National Football League. Hurlburt played college football at the University of Chicago and attended Marshalltown High School in Marshalltown, Iowa. He was a member of the Chicago Cardinals team that were NFL champions in 1925.

External links
Just Sports Stats
Fanbase profile

1898 births
1968 deaths
Players of American football from Iowa
American football halfbacks
Chicago Maroons football players
Chicago Cardinals players
People from Burlington, Iowa